Jacob John Boultes (August 6, 1884 – December 24, 1955) was a professional baseball player of the early twentieth century. He played three seasons (1907–1909) for the Boston Doves, mostly as a pitcher although he also played a handful of games as a position player in 1907. In 42 games, Boultes had a record of 8 wins and 14 losses with an ERA of 2.96.

References

External links

1884 births
1955 deaths
Boston Doves players
Major League Baseball pitchers
Baseball players from Missouri
Minor league baseball managers
Johnstown Johnnies players
Lowell Tigers players
Lowell Grays players
Bridgeport Crossmen players
St. Joseph Drummers players